Serena and Venus Williams defeated Daniela Hantuchová and Ai Sugiyama in the final, 6–3, 6–3 to win the women's doubles tennis title at the 2009 Australian Open. It was their third Australian Open doubles title together and eighth major title together overall.
 
Alona Bondarenko and Kateryna Bondarenko were the defending champions, but were defeated in the first round by Gisela Dulko and Roberta Vinci.

Seeds

Draw

Finals

Top half

Section 1

Section 2

Bottom half

Section 3

Section 4

External links
 2009 Australian Open – Women's draws and results at the International Tennis Federation

Women's Doubles
Australian Open (tennis) by year – Women's doubles
2009 in Australian women's sport